184th may refer to:

184th (2nd South Midland) Brigade, formation of the Territorial Force of the British Army
184th AAA Battalion (United States), attached to the 49th AAA Brigade
184th Battalion, CEF, unit in the Canadian Expeditionary Force during the First World War
184th Fighter Squadron, unit of the Arkansas Air National Guard that flew the A-10 Thunderbolt II
184th Infantry Regiment (United States) (Second California), infantry regiment of the United States Army
184th Intelligence Wing, located at McConnell AFB, Kansas
184th Nembo Parachute Division, airborne division of the Italian Army during World War II
184th Ohio Infantry (or 184th OVI), infantry regiment in the Union Army during the American Civil War
184th Ordnance Battalion (EOD) accomplish the explosive ordnance disposal (EOD) support activity
184th Reconnaissance Aviation Regiment, Yugoslav aviation regiment established in 1948
184th Rifle Division (Soviet Union), Soviet Red Army division during World War II
Pennsylvania's 184th Representative District

See also
184 (number)
184, the year 184 (CLXXXIV) of the Julian calendar
184 BC